Andrew Wyatt Blakemore is an American musician, songwriter and record producer. Born and raised in Manhattan, New York, he began his career playing in New York bands such as The A.M. and Black Beetle. He gained wider notability as the frontman of the Swedish electronic pop band Miike Snow, which released its acclaimed debut album in 2009. Since that time, Wyatt has released two other with the band as well as his solo debut Descender on Downtown Records in 2013.

Wyatt has worked with other artists, writing and/or producing songs with artists including Liam Gallagher, Lady Gaga, Lorde, Bruno Mars and others. As a songwriter, Wyatt has been nominated for the Song of the Year Grammy Award twice. In 2019, he won the Grammy Award for Best Song Written for Visual Media for his work with Lady Gaga, Mark Ronson, and Anthony Rossomando on "Shallow" from A Star is Born; the group was awarded the 2018 Academy Award for Best Original Song as well.

Early life and education
Wyatt grew up on Perry Street in Manhattan, New York City, in the 1980s. At 18, he and musician Greg Kurstin formed the short-lived experimental pop band Funkraphiliacs, whereupon he was signed to Capitol Records as a solo artist. He worked on the album Peter Gabriel's Real World studios for about a year until drug addiction and psychological issues forced him into hospitalization. After his stay in rehab, Wyatt moved to a small mountain town in Colorado for several years, and he briefly attended the University of Colorado.

Career
After briefly studying at classical conservatory, Wyatt returned to New York City and shortly thereafter formed the group The A.M. with Michael Tighe and Parker Kindred, formerly of Jeff Buckley's band. The group released one album on Universal UK before disbanding in 2005.

Wyatt is currently the lead singer and co-songwriter for the Swedish band Miike Snow.

Outside of his own projects, Wyatt has worked extensively with other artists, writing and/or producing songs with Carl Barat, Mark Ronson, Tiggers, Dragons of Zynth, Coco Sumner, and others. In 2011 Wyatt co-wrote "Grenade" with Bruno Mars. The song went to number one in several countries including the U.S, and earned a Grammy Nomination for Song of the Year. Recently, Wyatt began creating sound installations and video art for galleries, and debuted Waves, a collaboration with photographer / video artist Sebastian Mlynarski, at The New Museum in New York. He co-created the music for the 2012 one-act ballet "Carbon Life" along with Mark Ronson and Wayne McGregor.

Wyatt released his debut solo album Descender on April 16, 2013, on INGRID/Downtown Records, the album features the 75-piece Prague Philharmonic Orchestra with additional appearances by The Libertines' Anthony Rossomando, Spiritualized's bassist Brad Truax, Amen Dunes' Damon McMahon, and Tortoise's John Herndon. The only live performance of the album was at Capitale in New York City on May 10, 2013, as part of the Downtown Festival. A short documentary directed by Sebastian Mlynarski, entitled "The Making of Descender,"  was made in collaboration with The Creator's Project on March 19, 2013. In the documentary Wyatt discussed the challenges of completing the album in only a month, as that was the only time he had between Miike Snow tours and it gave a behind the scenes look at the recording process.

The first single from the project, "And Septimus...", was made available for streaming on February 19, 2013, and a music video for the single that was filmed in Buenos Aires and directed by Sebastian Mlynarski, premiered on Rolling Stone.com on May 7, 2013.

In May 2015, Wyatt collaborated with Flume on his track "Some Minds", featuring vocals and lyrics.

Andrew Wyatt earned the Academy Award for Best Original Song in 2019 for "Shallow", which he co-wrote with Lady Gaga, Mark Ronson and Anthony Rossomando. For Wyatt, Ronson and Rossomando, it was their first nomination and first win; for Lady Gaga, it was her second nomination and first win.

On June 29, 2019, Wyatt joined Liam Gallagher onstage at the 2019 Glastonbury Festival, playing guitar on "The River", which he co-wrote with the former Oasis frontman. It was one of eleven tracks co-written by Wyatt to feature on Gallagher's second album Why Me? Why Not., seven of which he also produced. The album was released in September 2019, and reached number one in the UK charts.

Production and songwriting credits

Institutional works

Discography 

Studio albums (selected)
2004: The A.M.
2009: Miike Snow
2012: Happy to You
2013: Descender
2016: iii

Sound installations
2010: Waves at The New Museum: Initiation w/Sebastian Mlynarski

Ballet Scores
2012: The Royal Ballet of London: Carbon Life with Mark Ronson

Awards and nominations

References

Further reading

External links
Andrew Wyatt on Myspace
Andrew Wyatt on Last.fm

Place of birth missing (living people)
Living people
American film score composers
American male film score composers
American expatriates in Sweden
American rock guitarists
American rock bass guitarists
American rock keyboardists
American rock singers
Best Original Song Academy Award-winning songwriters
Golden Globe Award-winning musicians
Grammy Award winners
Miike Snow members
Musicians from New York City
Songwriters from New York (state)
Record producers from New York (state)
People from Manhattan
The A.M. members
Downtown Records artists
Columbia Records artists
1971 births